The 2018 Speedway European Championship season was the sixth season of the Speedway European Championship (SEC) era, and the 18th UEM Individual Speedway European Championship. It was the fifth series under the promotion of One Sport Lts. of Poland.

The championship was won by Denmark's Leon Madsen, who finished 11 points ahead of Jarosław Hampel in second. Madsen won the last two rounds of the series, scoring a full 15-point maximum in the final round. Robert Lambert finished third overall, with Antonio Lindbäck and Mikkel Michelsen completing the top five.

Qualification 
For the 2018 season, 15 permanent riders were joined at each SEC Final by one wildcard and two track reserves.

Defending champion, Andžejs Ļebedevs from Latvia was automatically invited to participate in all final events, while Václav Milík, Krzysztof Kasprzak and Andreas Jonsson secured their participation in all final events thanks to being in the top five of the general classification in the 2017 season. Artem Laguta, who finished second in 2017, declined his invite, meaning an extra wildcard was announced.

Five riders qualified through the SEC Challenge, while Leon Madsen, Jarosław Hampel, Piotr Pawlicki Jr., Antonio Lindbäck, Kai Huckenbeck and Robert Lambert were named as series wildcards.

Qualified riders

Calendar

Qualification 
The calendar for qualification consisted of 3 Semi-final events and one SEC Challenge event.

Championship Series 
A four-event calendar was scheduled for the final series, with events in Poland, Germany and Latvia.

Classification

See also 
 2018 Speedway Grand Prix

References

External links 

 

2018
European Championship
Speedway European Championship